Salarias sibogai is a species of combtooth blenny found in coral reefs in the western central Pacific ocean.

References

sibogai
Taxa named by Hans Bath
Fish described in 1992